Protocol analysis is a psychological research method that elicits verbal reports from research participants. Protocol analysis is used to study thinking in cognitive psychology (Crutcher, 1994), cognitive science (Simon & Kaplan, 1989), and behavior analysis (Austin & Delaney, 1998). It has found further application in the design of surveys and interviews (Sudman, Bradburn & Schwarz, 1996), usability testing (Henderson, Smith, Podd, & Varela-Alvarez, 1995), educational psychology (Pressley & Afflerbach 1995; Renkl, 1997) and design research (Gero & McNeill 1998).

See also
 Content analysis
 Partial concurrent thinking aloud
 Think aloud protocol

References
 Austin, J., & Delaney, P. F. (1998). Protocol analysis as a tool for behavior analysis. Analysis of Verbal Behavior, 15, 41–56.
 Crutcher, R. J. (1994). Telling what we know: The use of verbal report methodologies in psychological research. Psychological Science, 5, 241–244.
 Ericsson, K. A., & Crutcher, R. J. (1991). Introspection and verbal reports on cognitive processes - two approaches to the study of thought processes: A response to Howe. New Ideas in Psychology, 9, 57–71.
 Ericsson, K. A., & Simon, H. A. (1993). Protocol analysis: Verbal reports as data. MIT Press, Cambridge,  MA.
 Gero, J. S. & McNeill, T (1998) An approach to the analysis of design protocols, Design Studies 19(1): 21-61.
 Pressley, M., & Afflerbach, P. (1995). Verbal protocols of reading: The nature of constructively responsive reading. Hillsdale, NJ, USA: Erlbaum.
 Renkl, A. (1997). Learning from worked-out examples: A study on individual differences. Cognitive Science, 21, 1–29.
 Sudman, S., Bradburn, N. M., & Schwarz, N. (Eds.)(1996). Thinking about answers: The application of cognitive processes to survey methodology. San Francisco, CA, USA: Jossey-Bass.

External links
 protocol analysis
 : A tool for facilitating verbal protocol analysis in English, German, Spanish, or Chinese.

Psychological methodology
Cognitive science